Mark Americus Costantino (April 9, 1920 – June 17, 1990) was a United States district judge of the United States District Court for the Eastern District of New York.

Education and career

Born in Staten Island, New York, Costantino served as a private in the United States Army from 1942 to 1946, and then received a Bachelor of Laws from Brooklyn Law School in 1947. He was a special deputy state attorney general of New York from 1947 to 1951, then entered private practice in Staten Island until 1956. He was a judge of the City Court of New York City from 1956 to 1966, and of the New York Civil Court from 1966 to 1971. Throughout this time, he was an acting judge of the New York Supreme Court (the trial court of New York), Second Judicial Department.

Federal judicial service

Costantino was nominated by President Richard Nixon on April 26, 1971, to the United States District Court for the Eastern District of New York, to a new seat authorized by 84 Stat. 294. He was confirmed by the United States Senate on May 20, 1971, and received his commission on May 20, 1971. He assumed senior status on December 1, 1987. His service terminated on June 17, 1990, due to his death in Staten Island.

References

External links
 

1920 births
1990 deaths
Brooklyn Law School alumni
Judges of the United States District Court for the Eastern District of New York
United States district court judges appointed by Richard Nixon
20th-century American judges
United States Army personnel of World War II
American people of Italian descent